Koniskos (Greek: Κονισκός) is a village in the southwestern Trikala regional unit, Greece. It was the seat of the municipality of Tymfaia. In 2011 Koniskos had a population of 196 for the village and 294 for the community (including the village Kalochori). It is located in the Antichasia mountains, 25 km north of the city of Trikala, and 17 km northeast of Kalambaka.

Population

See also
List of settlements in the Trikala regional unit

References

External links
 Koniskos on GTP Travel Pages

Populated places in Trikala (regional unit)